Comité de Unidade de Acção e Coordenação Sindical de Angola ('Trade Union Action and Coordination Unity Committee of Angola', abbreviated CUACSA) was an Angolan trade union alliance in exile, formed through the merger of the National Union of Angolan Workers (UNTA) and the Confederation of Free Trade Unions of Angola (CSLA). The organization was based in Kinshasa. CUACSA had around 200 members. Overall, the organization had little activity. In July 1966 CUACSA fell apart as CSLA withdrew from it.

References

Defunct trade unions of Angola
1964 establishments in the Democratic Republic of the Congo
1966 disestablishments in the Democratic Republic of the Congo